Ogmore is a constituency created in 1918 represented in the House of Commons of the UK Parliament by Chris Elmore of the Labour Party.

Boundaries 

1918–1983: The Urban Districts of Bridgend, Maesteg, and Ogmore and Garw, and part of the Rural District of Penybont.

1983–2010: The Borough of Ogwr wards of Bettws, Blackmill, Blaengarw, Caerau, Llangeinor, Llangynwyd, Maesteg East, Maesteg West, Nantyffyllon, Nant-y-moel, Ogmore Vale, Pencoed, Pontycymmer, St Bride's Minor, and Ynysawdre, and the Borough of Taff-Ely wards of Brynna, Gilfach Goch, Llanharan, and Llanharry.

2010–present: The Bridgend County Borough electoral divisions of Aberkenfig, Bettws, Blackmill, Blaengarw, Bryncethin, Bryncoch, Caerau, Cefn Cribwr, Felindre, Hendre, Llangeinor, Llangynwyd, Maesteg East, Maesteg West, Nant-y-moel, Ogmore Vale, Penprysg, Pontycymmer, Sarn, and Ynysawdre, and those in Rhondda Cynon Taff County Borough of Brynna, Gilfach Goch, Llanharan, and Llanharry.

Taking its name from the River Ogmore, the constituency is close to the source of the river in the Ogwr valley, but it excludes the village of Ogmore-by-Sea, south-west of Bridgend (Pen-y-bont ar Ogwr). Ogmore constituency covers the area of Bridgend County Borough Council roughly north of the M4, and parts of Rhondda Cynon Taf County Borough Council. It includes the communities of Cefn Cribwr, Garw Valley, Gilfach Goch, Llanharan, Maesteg, Ogwr Valley, Pencoed, Sarn, and Tondu.

Major boundary change
A substantial change of boundaries took effect in 1983, when the new constituency of Bridgend was set up, centred on the town of that name, which was by then the largest settlement in Ogmore. The constituency has since that date consisted of the northern part of the original constituency, together with wards from the former Borough of Taff-Ely (now Rhondda Cynon Taf CBC).

History
Summary of winning results
The 2015 result made the seat the 44th-safest of Labour's 232 seats by percentage of majority. Successive candidates fielded by the Labour Party have won absolute majorities (pluralities) since the seat was created in 1918, or have run unopposed four times. The 2019 election was the first time in the seat's 101-year history that Labour failed to win an absolute majority, though the party still won with a margin of 22%

Opposition parties
Four parties have taken the runner-up position from and including a 2002 by-election, a total of five elections.  At the 2015 general election the Liberal Democrat, Green and TUSC candidates did not win 5% of the vote apiece therefore forfeited their deposits.  Those running for the Conservatives and UKIP in 2015 (and 2016 at the by-election held during the month before the UK's EU membership referendum) held their deposits.  The highest polling of any runner-up, by percentage, was Thomas George Jones in 1931, winning 30.8% of the votes cast, 0.3% more than half the percentage polled by the winning candidate; this was when the Labour Party's vote was slightly split by the presence of a prominent Communist Party candidate and editor, Johnny Campbell. The government's dropping of a prosecution against him in 1924 had led to a General Election.

Turnout
Turnout at general elections has ranged between 85.3% in 1950 and 57.8% in 2005, falling to 35.2% in the 2002 by-election.

Members of Parliament

Elections

Elections in the 1910s

Elections in the 1920s

Elections in the 1930s

Elections in the 1940s

Elections in the 1950s

Elections in the 1960s

Elections in the 1970s

Elections in the 1980s

Elections in the 1990s

Elections in the 2000s

Following the death of Sir Ray Powell on 7 December 2001 a by-election was held on 14 February 2002.

Elections in the 2010s

Of the 72 rejected ballots:
51 were either unmarked or it was uncertain who the vote was for.
21 voted for more than one candidate.

Of the 55 rejected ballots:
36 were either unmarked or it was uncertain who the vote was for.
19 voted for more than one candidate.

Of the 96 rejected ballots:
64 were either unmarked or it was uncertain who the vote was for.
32 voted for more than one candidate.

See also
 Ogmore (Senedd constituency)
 1931 Ogmore by-election
 1946 Ogmore by-election
 2002 Ogmore by-election
 2016 Ogmore by-election
 List of parliamentary constituencies in Mid Glamorgan
 List of parliamentary constituencies in Wales

Notes

References

Further reading
 
 
A Vision Of Britain Through Time (Constituency elector numbers)

External links
Politics Resources (Election results from 1922 onwards)
Electoral Calculus (Election results from 1955 onwards)
2017 Election House of Commons Library 2017 Election report
A Vision Of Britain Through Time (Constituency elector numbers)

Parliamentary constituencies in South Wales
Politics of Bridgend County Borough
Constituencies of the Parliament of the United Kingdom established in 1918
Mid Glamorgan